Alyaksandr Baranaw (born 27 November 1974) is a retired Belarusian professional footballer. He works as a youth coach with  BATE Borisov.

Career
Born in Minsk, Baranaw began playing football in Smena Minsk youth system. He played for FC Zarya Yazyl in the Second Division and joined Stroitel's senior team where he made his Belarusian Premier League debut in 1992. Baranaw would win the Premier League with FC BATE Borisov in 1999.

Honours
 Belarusian Premier League champion: 1999.

References

1974 births
Living people
Belarusian footballers
Russian Premier League players
FC BATE Borisov players
FC Rostov players
FC Lokomotiv Nizhny Novgorod players
FC Darida Minsk Raion players
FC Naftan Novopolotsk players
FC Smorgon players
FC Volgar Astrakhan players
FC Starye Dorogi players
FC Gorodeya players
Expatriate footballers in Russia
Belarusian expatriate footballers
Association football midfielders